Carlos Nóbrega (Portuguese; born 19 September 1979, in Funchal) is a Singer, songwriter, actor, Photographer and Writer.

Early life 
Nóbrega was born and raised between Funchal, Madeira Island and Lisbon, Portugal. He is the second of two children, with an older sister, Carla.  He attended Escola Superior de Educação do Porto and Escola Superior de Educação do Porto, a public university. He embarked on a singing career from age 12 and by the age of 17 he decided to go into acting.

Career 
Carlos Nóbrega took part in many talent shows on the TV such Cantigas da Rua (SIC – TV Channel), Nasci p'ra Musica (TVI – TV Channel), "Festival da canção Juvenil da Madeira" (RTP – TV Channel), "Festival da canção do Faial" (RTP – TV Channel), and events in Portugal and Europe. 
He got his start in television as an actor on the TV show Riscos, RTP and he starred in many movies, TV series, plays, in Portugal and Europe such Águila Roja, TVE, in Spain. He has contributed to numerous Disney soundtracks in Portugal and he was member of the successful Portuguese Pop Band Máximo in the 90s, having a number 1 in the music tops in Portugal with the Christmas song "O Natal Na Minha Terra" released by the label Vidisco, in 1998.
According to his own officials' accounts and website he finished the thriller movie Desierto, from the Spanish director Jose Luis Endera. Having spent most of his life working diligently as a world renowned entertainer and performer, the 36-year-old artist, released his first charted single Pitiful, on 19 September 2011 and the EP: “Pitiful The echoes” , which includes the 8 official remixes and the acoustic version for "Pitiful", in December 2011.
Pitiful, was featured on the compilation "This beat is POPTRONIK – VOL I", released in 2012 by Aztec Records and EQ Music and was one of the artists performing on the mini-tour Poptronik on Summer of 2012 2012. 
His second acclaimed and charted single was the single Turn it Up, produced by Arake, and written & composed by himself and was released on 5 June 2012, followed by the charted single Music Makes you lose control, released on 13 August produced by DABEAT. In the same year he released with the Portuguese Dj Sky Santos, the house chilled track I Miss you .
Between 2012–2014 he was touring in Spain with Los 40 Principales and spent most time composing his upcoming album. 
.
Carlos releases one year later from his latest release, the video for Breathe me directed by Fran Martinez, from Sia releasing a new covers Ep, called 'ALL OF ME - SONGS I WISH I WROTE ( The Piano sessions EP) ', on his social networks and website in November 2015, including covers from Sia, John Legend and A Great Big World . 
Carlos's Pop/Electro/R&B fused sound is mainly influenced by the likes of Chris Brown, Usher, Justin Timberlake, Danny Saucedo.
His journey began writing songs from a very young age and now he is finally ready to unleash his electrifying debut album called The Art of Making Love, TAOML, to be released in 2016 according to his own accounts, blogs and official website.

Discography

Studio albums 
 2016: TAOML, The Art of Making Love

Features
 2012: This Beat Is POPTRONIK – Volume One by EQ Music

EP's
 2015: ALL OF ME – SONGS I WISH I WROTE (The Piano sessions EP) 
 2012: Pitiful: The echoes EP.

Singles 
 2011: Pitiful 
 2012: Turn it up 
 2012: I miss you
 2012: Music makes you lose control

Television

Filmography

Theatre

Gallery

Books

References

External links 

 Website oficial
 
 
 
 

1979 births
Living people
People from Funchal
21st-century Portuguese male singers
Portuguese male singer-songwriters
Musicians from Madrid
Musicians from Lisbon
Portuguese male actors
20th-century Portuguese male actors
21st-century Portuguese male actors
Male actors from Lisbon
20th-century Portuguese male singers